The Kabwa are a Bantu ethnolinguistic group based in Mara Region in north-central Tanzania.

References

Ethnic groups in Tanzania